The following lists events that happened during 1931 in New Zealand.

Population
 Estimated population as of 31 December: 1,522,800
 Increase since previous 31 December 1930: 16,000 (1.06%)
 Males per 100 females: 103.8

Incumbents

Regal and viceregal
Head of state - George V
Governor-General - The Lord Bledisloe GCMG KBE PC

Government

The 23rd New Zealand Parliament continued with the coalition of the United Party and the Labour Party with the Reform Party in opposition. During the year the agreement between United and Labour collapsed due to differing opinions on how to counter the Great Depression. The Reform Party, fearing that the Depression would give Labour a substantial boost, reluctantly agreed to form a coalition with United to avert elections. By forming a coalition, United and Reform were able to blunt Labour's advantage, ending the possibility of the anti-Labour vote being split and the general election in December saw the United–Reform Coalition winning a majority.

Speaker of the House - Charles Statham (Independent)
Prime Minister - George Forbes
Minister of Finance - George Forbes (United) until 22 September, then William Downie Stewart (Reform)
Minister of Foreign Affairs - George Forbes
Attor - Thomas Sidey until 22 September, then William Downie Stewart
Chief Justice — Sir Michael Myers

Parliamentary opposition
 Leader of the Opposition - Gordon Coates (Reform) until 22 September, then Harry Holland (Labour).

Main centre leaders
Mayor of Auckland - George Baildon, succeeded by George Hutchison
Mayor of Wellington - George Troup, succeeded by Thomas Hislop
Mayor of Christchurch - John Archer, succeeded by Dan Sullivan
Mayor of Dunedin - Robert Black

Events 

 7 January: Australian aviator Guy Menzies makes the first solo flight across the Tasman sea, starting from Sydney and ending 11 hours 45 minutes later with a crash landing in a swamp near Harihari on the West Coast
 3 February: The Hawkes Bay earthquake, New Zealand's worst, kills 256 people, mainly in Napier and Hastings
 8 February: A Desoutter aircraft of Dominion Airline crashed near Wairoa, killing all three people aboard. This is the first fatality on a scheduled air service in New Zealand.
 27 February: Oscar Garden lands his Gipsy Moth aircraft at Horseshoe Bay on Stewart Island/Rakiura, the first aircraft to land on the island.

Arts and literature

See 1931 in art, 1931 in literature, :Category:1931 books

Music

See: 1931 in music

Radio

See: Public broadcasting in New Zealand

Film

See: :Category:1931 film awards, 1931 in film, List of New Zealand feature films, Cinema of New Zealand, :Category:1931 films

Sport

Chess
 The 40th National Chess Championship was held in Rotorua, and was won by A.W. Gyles of Wellington.

Golf
 The 21st New Zealand Open championship was won by Andrew Shaw, his 4th win.
 The 35th National Amateur Championships were held in Christchurch 
 Men: Rana Wagg (Hutt)
 Women: Miss B. Gaisford

Horse racing

Harness racing
 New Zealand Trotting Cup – Harold Logan
 Auckland Trotting Cup – Royal Silk

Thoroughbred racing
 New Zealand Cup – Spearful
 Avondale Gold Cup – Little Doubt
 Auckland Cup – Admiral Drake
 Wellington Cup – Stanchion
 New Zealand Derby – Bronze Eagle

Lawn bowls
The national outdoor lawn bowls championships are held in Auckland.
 Men's singles champion – N.C. Bell (Hamilton Bowling Club)
 Men's pair champions – H.G. Loveridge, R.N. Pilkington (skip) (Hamilton Bowling Club)
 Men's fours champions – J.D. Best, A.J.H. Gregory, H. Gardiner, G.A. Deare (skip) (Dunedin Bowling Club)

Rugby league
New Zealand national rugby league team

Rugby Union
:Category:Rugby union in New Zealand, :Category:All Blacks
 Ranfurly Shield

Soccer
 1931 Chatham Cup won by Tramurewa (Auckland)
 Provincial league champions: 
	Auckland:	Thistle
	Canterbury:	Rangers, Nomads (shared)
	Hawke's Bay:	National Tobacco
	Nelson:	Hospital
	Otago:	HSOB
	Southland:	Rangers
	Taranaki:	Hawera, Albion (shared)
	Waikato:	Rotowaro
	Wanganui:	KP's
	Wellington:	Petone

Births

January
 1 January – Inez Kingi, health advocate
 2 January – Ritchie Johnston, cyclist
 12 January – Bert Ormond, association footballer
 14 January – Norm Wilson, cricketer
 19 January – Pat Hunt, politician
 20 January – Allan Tong, rower
 23 January – Gordon McLauchlan, author
 30 January – Doug Wilson, rugby union player

February
 1 February – Nicholas Tarling, historian
 10 February – Keith Bagley, rugby union player
 14 February – Peter Wardle, botanist
 15 February – Lloyd Ashby, rugby union player
 21 February
 Warren Dibble, poet, playwright
 Te Paekiomeka Joy Ruha, Māori leader
 22 February – Bryce Postles, cricketer

March
 4 March – Don Jowett, athlete, rugby union player
 5 March
 Ian Clarke, rugby union player
 Brian Fitzpatrick, rugby union player
 9 March – Jack Lasenby, children's author
 10 March – Colin Loader, rugby union player
 11 March – Colin Jillings, Thoroughbred racehorse trainer
 19 March – Cliff Skeggs, businessman, politician, mayor of Dunedin
 31 March – Shirley Murray, hymn lyricist

April
 3 April – Elspeth Kennedy, sharebroker, community leader (died 2017)
 4 April
 Eric Anderson, rugby union player and coach
 Catherine Tizard, politician, mayor of Auckland, 16th governor-general (died 2021)
 6 April – Ian Grey, rugby league player
 7 April – John McDonald, cricketer
 9 April – Ruth Castle, weaver
 10 April – Neil Waters, chemist, university administrator
 13 April – Doug Armstrong, cricketer, sports broadcaster, politician
 14 April – Bruce Pairaudeau, cricketer
 20 April – Bill Tolhurst, politician
 23 April – John Williams, cricketer

May
 3 May – Malcolm Hahn, javelin thrower
 12 May – Murray Ashby, rower
 17 May – Thomas Eichelbaum, jurist
 20 May – Barry Brown, boxer
 22 May – Buddy Lucas, swimmer, surf livesaver
 23 May – Rex Austin, politician

June
 2 June – Joyce Waters, inorganic chemist
 18 June – Jane Soons, geomorphologist
 19 June – Heather Nicholson geologist, writer
 26 June
 George Martin, rugby league player, field athlete
 John Scott, medical researcher

July
 2 July – Robin Gray, politician
 6 July – John Spencer, boat designer
 18 July – Peter Goddard, educationalist
 21 July – Roy Meehan, wrestler
 23 July – Te Atairangikaahu, 6th Māori monarch
 24 July – Ray Laurent, rower
 25 July – Murray Day, squash administrator
 26 July – Jean Puketapu, Māori language activist, kōhanga reo pioneer
 27 July – David Goldsmith, field hockey player
 28 July – Peter Shirtcliffe, businessman

August
 3 August
 Rod Bieleski, plant physiologist
 Lee Grant, actress, singer
 9 August
 Mike Hinge, artist and illustrator
 Ernie Leonard, television presenter, wrestling commentator, actor
 10 August
 Richard Atkins, diplomat
 Bruce Slane, public servant, lawyer
 11 August – Ralph Hotere, artist
 13 August – Norman Read, racewalker
 22 August – Maurice Gee, novelist, screenwriter

September
 4 September – Bill Skelton, jockey
 5 September
 Bill Bell, cricketer
 Stew Nairn, sports shooter
 12 September – John Ogilvie, cricketer
 15 September
 Brian Henderson, radio and television personality
 Lincoln Hurring, swimmer and swimming coach
 Harold Marshall, acoustician
 28 September – Noel Pope, local-body politician
 30 September – Geoffrey Chisholm, urologist

October
 6 October – Michael Hardie Boys, jurist, 17th governor-general
 9 October – Mark Otway, tennis player
 14 October – Colin Dickinson, cyclist
 16 October
 Peter Bush, sports photographer
 Kristin Jacobi, swimmer
 Ian Quigley, politician
 17 October – Mazhar Krasniqi, Muslim community leader, human rights activist
 23 October – James McNeish, novelist, playwright, biographer
 29 October – Murray Loudon, field hockey player, dentist
 30 October – Alma Johnson, television personality

November
 2 November – Steve Kuzmicich, statistician
 9 November – Eion Scarrow, gardening personality, broadcaster and author
 12 November – Jeanne Macaskill, artist
 21 November – Bruce Townshend, politician
 27 November – Keith Allen, politician
 30 November – Vivian Lynn, artist

December
 8 December – David Crooks, air force officer
 11 December – Bryce Harland, diplomat
 17 December – Frank Devine, journalist, newspaper editor
 18 December – Noel McGregor, cricketer

Exact date unknown
 Nola Barron, potter
 Con Cambie, natural products chemist
 Beverley Holloway, entomologist
 Pat Moore, cricketer
 Bruce Papas, fashion designer
 Beverley Randell, children's author

Deaths

January–March
 12 January – Peter Cheal, surveyor (born 1846)
 18 January
 Daldy MacWilliams, goldminer, businessman, sportsman (born 1860) 
 Owen Merton, painter (born 1887)
 20 January – Shailer Weston, politician (born 1868)
 31 January – Job Osborne, farm contractor, well-sinker (born 1842)
 21 February – Rhona Haszard, artist (born 1901)
 27 February – Edith Searle Grossmann, novelist, journalist, feminist (born 1863)
 15 March – William Beattie, photographer (born 1864)

April–June
 13 April – Joseph Firth, cricketer, sports administrator, educator (born 1859)
 18 April – Arthur Hall, politician (born 1880)
 3 May – Hannah Dudley, Methodist mission sister (born 1864)
 10 May – Anna Stout, social reformer (born 1858)
 22 May – Bernard Chambers, viticulturist, winemaker (born 1859)
 26 May – Richard Barton, pastoralist, author (born 1879)
 6 June – William Baucke, linguist, ethnologist, journalist (born 1848)
 10 June – May Moore, photographer (born 1881)

July–September
 5 July – Henry Winkelmann, photographer (born 1860)
 12 July – Noel Brodrick, surveyor (born 1855)
 1 August – Dick Stewart, rugby union player (born 1871)
 12 August – Lizzie Rattray, journalist, suffragist (born 1855)
 28 August – Tene Waitere, carver (born 1853)
 9 September – Elsdon Best, ethnographer (born 1856)
 10 September – Pratt Kempthorne, Anglican clergyman (born 1849)

October–December
 6 October – Robert Yates, cricketer (born 1845)
 24 October
 Alfred Eckhold, rugby union player, cricketer (born 1885)
 John Potter, stonemason, builder (born 1834)
 28 October – Edward Tregear, surveyor, public servant, linguist (born 1846)
 30 October – Joseph Witheford, politician (born 1848)
 31 October – Charles Gleeson, cricketer (born 1845)
 28 November
 John Stalker, rugby union player (born 1881)
 Heathcote Williams, cricket player and administrator (born 1859)
 7 December – Sir John Luke, politician, mayor of Wellington (born 1858)
 23 December – Jack Stanaway, rugby league player (born 1873)
 29 December – William Earnshaw, politician (born 1852)

See also
List of years in New Zealand
Timeline of New Zealand history
History of New Zealand
Military history of New Zealand
Timeline of the New Zealand environment
Timeline of New Zealand's links with Antarctica

References

External links

 
Years of the 20th century in New Zealand